John Joseph Fogarty (5 March 1882 – 13 November 1956) was an Australian rules footballer who played with South Melbourne in the Victorian Football League (VFL).

Notes

External links 

1882 births
1956 deaths
Australian rules footballers from Melbourne
Sydney Swans players
People from North Melbourne